After the War is Over is a 1918 song written during World War I, and was composed by Harry Andrieu, with lyrics written by Joseph Woodruff, E.J. Pourmon and Andrew B. Sterling. The song was published by Joe Morris Music Co., and was written for voice and piano.

There are four versions of the score published by the Joe Morris Music Co. and two known issues from Broad & Market Music Company.

The song is a celebratory song, anticipating that American soldiers will end the war and return home. The song also celebrates General Pershing, a key American general, and references the Second Battle of the Marne, which resulted in a decisive Allied victory.

Lyrics 
Angels, they are weeping over the foreign wars

Changed will be the pictures of the foreign lands

Trains, Ports are sailing from shore to shore

Maps will change entirely to different hands

Brave Heroes are falling to arise no more

Kings and Queens may ever rule their fellow man

But still, the bugles calling every man to war

But pray they’ll be united like our own free land

After the war is over and the world’s at peace

Many a heart will be aching after the war has ceased

Many a heart will be vacant, Many a child will be alone

But I hope they’ll all be happy in a place called home sweet home

References

1918 songs
Songs of World War I
Songs with lyrics by Andrew B. Sterling